Ectopic decidua are decidual cells found outside inner lining of the uterus. This condition was first described in 1971 by Walker and the name 'ectopic decidua' was coined by Tausig. While ectopic decidua is most commonly seen during pregnancy, it rarely occurs in non-pregnant people, accompanied by bleeding and pain.

Generally, ectopic decidua has no clinical symptoms, but it sometimes manifests as abdominal pain in pregnancy. Ectopic decidua most commonly occurs the ovary, cervix and serosal lining of the uterus. It rarely occurs in peritoneum also. In the peritoneum, ectopic decidua is formed due to metaplasia of subserosal stromal cells under the influence of progesterone. It regresses within 4–6 weeks after childbirth. Therefore, no treatment is needed for this condition. However, it is necessary to differentiate deciduosis from metastatic cancers and mesothelioma.

References

Histopathology
Human pregnancy